Macrotomoxia palpalis is a species of beetle in the genus Macrotomoxia of the family Mordellidae, which is part of the superfamily Tenebrionoidea. It was discovered in 1935.

References

Beetles described in 1935
Mordellidae